Jürgen Herrlein  (born 1962 in Regensburg) is a German lawyer and historian of academic corporations.

Life 
Herrlein grew up in Regensburg (Germany) and Friedrichsdorf/Taunus. After graduation in 1981 at the Kaiserin-Friedrich-Gymnasium in Bad Homburg, in 1982 he studied law at the Goethe University Frankfurt.
After completion of studies and the legal clerkship (Referendariat), in 1994 Herrlein became a lawyer in Frankfurt/Main.
Until 2000 he was partner in a law firm, from then until 2007 he was a managing partner of a lawyer and tax consultancy partnership. Since then he is working in his newly established office of specialized lawyers.
Before he became a certified law specialist (Fachanwalt) for law of tenancy and for condominium in 2005, he became a certified specialist for tax law in 2000.
Since the winter term 2005/2006 Herrlein is lecturer at the University of Frankfurt/Main. 
In 2006 he became editor of the Neue Zeitschrift für Miet- und Wohnungsrecht (NZM) which appears in the publishing house C.H. Beck.
Herrlein is a member of the corporations Corps Austria (received 1987), Borussia-Polonia (1999), Silesia (2000), Masovia (2002) und Tigurinia (2007).
The magazine Wirtschaftswoche counted him in 2010 among the top 25 tenancy lawyers of Germany.
As a legal author, Herrlein deals mainly with law of tenancy and tax law, his historical publications deal mainly with the history of German Student Corps.

Publications 
Herrlein is the author of multiple books, essays and annotations. Amongst them are:

Legal works 
 Jürgen Herrlein, Ronald Kandelhard (Hg.): Praxiskommentar Mietrecht, Recklinghausen: ZAP-Verlag, 4. Aufl. 2010, 
 Lutz Eiding, Lothar Ruf, Jürgen Herrlein: Öffentliches Baurecht in Hessen für Architekten, Bauingenieure und Juristen, München: C. H. Beck, 2. Aufl. 2007, 
 Jürgen Herrlein, Nikolaj Fischer: Kauf, Miete und Unterbringung von Pferden, Berlin: VWF, 2006, 
 Steuerrecht in der mietrechtlichen Praxis, Bonn: Deutscher AnwaltVerlag, 2007,

Historical works 
 Die akademische Verbindung Austria Wien, in: Einst und Jetzt, Jahrbuch des Verein für corpsstudentische Geschichtsforschung, Bd. 37, 1992, 293 ff.
 Der Mainzer Revolutionär Paul Stumpf und seine Ahnen, in: Genealogie 1998, S. 356 ff.
 Genealogie der Familie Rothamer aus Rotham bei Straubing, in: Blätter des Bayerischen Landesvereins für Familienkunde, 2002, 37 ff.
 Corps Austria – Corpsgeschichte 1861-2001, Frankfurt am Main 2003
 Jürgen Herrlein, Silvia Amella Mai (Hg.): Josef Neuwirth (1855-1934), Von der Wiege bis zur Bahre, Autobiographie, Frankfurt am Main 2009
 Jürgen Herrlein, Silvia Amella Mai: Heinrich Beer und seine studentischen Erinnerungen an Breslau 1847 bis 1850, Hilden: WJK-Verlag 2009, 
 Jürgen Herrlein, Silvia Amella Mai: Georg Zaeschmar und seine studentischen Erinnerungen an Breslau 1873 bis 1875, Hilden: WJK-Verlag 2010,

Essays about Herrlein 
 Friedhelm Golücke: Herrlein, Jürgen, in: Friedhelm Golücke (Hrg.), Verfasserlexikon zur Studenten- und Universitätsgeschichte, Köln: Sh-Verlag 2004, S. 143-144,

References

External links 

1962 births
Living people
People from Regensburg
20th-century German lawyers
Jurists from Bavaria
21st-century German lawyers